Moon, also spelled Mun, is a Korean family name. The 2000 South Korean census found a total of 426,927 people and 132,881 households with this family name. This is a list of notable people with the family name Moon, sorted by area of notability and year of birth.

Culture and the arts
Mun Ikjeom (1329–1398), politician of the Goryeo Dynasty and a Neo-Confucian scholar
Mun Il-pyeong (1888–1939), Joseon Dynasty historian
Moon Shin (1923–1995), South Korean painter and sculptor
Moon Deoksu (1928–2020), South Korean poet
Mun Jeonghui (born 1947), South Korean poet
Jiha Moon (born 1973), South Korean contemporary artist
Mun Kyong-jin (born 1981), possibly deceased North Korean violinist
Nami Mun,  Korean American novelist and short story writer
Moon Hyung-in, South Korean biotechnology professor
Moon Young-nam (born 1960), South Korean television screenwriter

Entertainers
Moon Hee (born 1947), South Korean actress
Mun Tae-jun (born 1970), South Korean poet
Moon So-ri (born 1974), South Korean actress
Moon Jeong-hee (born 1976), South Korean actress
Moon Nam-sook, South Korean voice actress
Moon Hee-joon (born 1978), South Korean singer-songwriter, member of boy band H.O.T.
Eric Mun (born 1979), South Korean rapper and member of boy band Shinhwa
Moon Se-yoon (born 1982), South Korean comedian and television personality
Moon Chae-won (born 1986), South Korean actress
Moon Geun-young (born 1987), South Korean actress
Moon Byul-yi (born 1992), South Korean singer and rapper, member of girl group Mamamoo
Moon Tae-il (born 1994), South Korean singer, member of boy band NCT
Moon Jong-up (born 1995), South Korean dancer and singer, member of boy band B.A.P.
Moon Ga-young (born 1996), German-born South Korean actress
Moon Hee-jung, South Korean television screenwriter
Moon Bin (born 1998), South Korean singer, member of boy band Astro
Moon Jun-won (born 1987), South Korean actor
Moon Ji-hoon (born 1986), South Korean rapper

Political figures
Moon Kook-hyun (born 1949), South Korean politician, leader of the Creative Korea Party
Mun Se-gwang (1951–1974), Japanese-born North Korean sympathizer who attempted to assassinate South Korean president Park Chung-Hee
Moon Chung-in (born 1951), South Korean politician
Moon Jae-in (born 1953), South Korean politician, civil servant and lawyer, 12th president of South Korea
Moon Sung-keun (born 1953), South Korean actor and politician

Religious figures
Moon Ik-hwan (1918–1994), South Korean theologian
Sun Myung Moon (1920–2012), South Korean religious leader, founder of the Unification Church, and his children
Heung Jin Moon (1966–1984)
Un Jin Moon (born 1967)
Moon Kook-jin (born 1970)
Mun Jeong-hyeon (born  1941), South Korean Catholic priest

Sports figures

Football
Moon Jung-sik (1930–2006), South Korean football player and manager
Mun In-guk (born 1978), North Korean footballer
Mun Seung-man (born 1989), South Korean former footballer
Moon Min-kui (born 1981), South Korean footballer
Moon Soon-ho (born 1981), South Korean footballer
Moon Joo-won (born 1983), South Korean footballer
Moon Byung-woo (born 1986), South Korean footballer
Moon Dae-seong (born 1986), South Korean footballer
Moon Je-chun (born 1987), South Korean footballer
Moon Jeong-joo (born 1990), South Korean footballer
Moon Ki-han (born 1989), South Korean footballer
Moon Sang-yun (born 1991), South Korean footballer
Moon Seon-min (born 1992), South Korean footballer
Moon Chang-jin (born 1993), South Korean footballer

Other
Moon Sung-kil (born 1963), South Korean professional boxer
Moon Kyung-ja (born 1965), South Korean basketball player and Olympic athlete
Moon Hyang-ja (born 1972), South Korean team handball player and Olympic gold medallist
Moon Eui-jae (born 1975), South Korean wrestler and Olympic silver medallist
Moon Tae-jong (born 1975), Korean American basketball player
Moon Dae-sung (born 1976), South Korean taekwondo athlete and Olympic gold medallist
Moon Kyeong-ha (born 1980), South Korean handball player and Olympic athlete
Mun Jun (born 1982), South Korean speed skater
Moon Pil-hee (born 1982), South Korean handball player and Olympic athlete
Moon Young-hui (born 1983), South Korean field hockey player and Olympic athlete
Moon Sung-min (born 1986), South Korean volleyball player
Moon Kwang-eun (born 1987), South Korean baseball player
Mun Ji-hee (born 1988), South Korean biathlete
Mun Sung-hak (born 1990), South Korean racing driver
Mun Yu-ra (born 1990), South Korean weightlifter
Moon Sung-hyun (born 1991), South Korean baseball player
Moon Jin-ju, South Korean wrestler

See also
List of Korean family names

References

Lists of Korean people
Lists of people by surname